Rocky Mountain Airways  was an American commuter airline headquartered in Hangar No. 6 of Stapleton International Airport in Denver, Colorado. It was sold to Texas Air Corporation/Continental Airlines in 1986 and was operated as a Continental Express subsidiary until its operations were merged with Britt Airways in 1991.
The airline flew from Denver's Stapleton International Airport to a variety of destinations in Colorado, Nebraska and Wyoming. The airline operated out of the old commuter terminal in Concourse A at Stapleton.

History
It was established as Vail Airways in 1963 by Gordon Autry. The airline adopted "Rocky Mountain Airways" in 1968, shortly after service to Aspen was introduced.

Vail Airways began operations with Cessna 310 piston twin aircraft, followed by the Rockwell Aero Commander piston twin. In 1969, Rocky Mountain Airways expanded with the 19 passenger de Havilland Canada DHC-6 Twin Otter twin engine turboprop. On February 3, 1978,  Rocky Mountain Airways took delivery as the worldwide launch customer of the larger, 50 passenger de Havilland Canada Dash 7-102  four engine turboprop. In 1983, Rocky Mountain had placed an order for six 37-passenger de Havilland Canada DHC-8 Dash 8 twin turboprops, coincident with the type's service introduction; however, no Dash 8 aircraft were subsequently delivered to Rocky Mountain.

Both the DHC-6 Twin Otter and the DHC-7 Dash 7 featured short takeoff and landing (STOL) performance. This enabled Rocky Mountain Airways to serve destinations that otherwise would not have received scheduled passenger air service.  One example was the Avon STOLport (WHR) located in close proximity to the Vail ski resort which was served with the Dash 7.  Another example was the Steamboat Springs Airport (KSBS or SBS) which was also served with the Dash 7. With a relatively short runway length of 4,452 feet and an airfield elevation of 6,882 feet, the Dash 7 was well suited for passenger operations from this small airport located near the Steamboat Springs ski resort. Rocky Mountain Airways also operated Twin Otter flights from Lake County Airport (LXV) in Leadville, Colorado. With an airfield elevation of 9,934 feet, Leadville is the highest airport ever to have received scheduled passenger air service in the U.S. The Avon STOLport, which was a private airstrip controlled by the airline at Vail, no longer exists. Airline service to Vail is now provided via the Eagle County Airport, 35 miles to the west via Interstate 70. Steamboat Springs is now served by the Yampa Valley Airport, 25 miles to the west via U.S. 40.  Leadville no longer has airline service.

Another primary route served by the airline was between Aspen-Pitkin County Airport and Denver. RMA flew the Twin Otter between the two destinations and then introduced Dash 7 service. The major competitor at the time in Aspen was Aspen Airways which flew Convair 440 piston engine prop aircraft which were subsequently replaced with Convair 580 turboprops. Aspen Airways then began operating British Aerospace BAe 146-100 jet aircraft on the route. Rocky Mountain and Aspen Airways competed for many years from Aspen.  Currently, Aspen-Denver service is flown by SkyWest Airlines operating as United Express with Canadair CRJ-700 regional jets.

Upon its sale to Texas Air Corporation in 1986, Rocky Mountain Airways began serving as a Continental Express air carrier in order to provide passenger feed at the Continental Airlines hub operation at Denver Stapleton International Airport at the time. The Twin Otter and Dash 7 aircraft were painted in Continental Airlines distinctive white livery with orange, red, and gold striping and "Continental Express" titles. The Continental Express code sharing service at Denver was shared at first with Trans-Colorado Airlines and was then greatly expanded in 1987 when Trans-Colorado ceased operating at Denver. The Twin Otters were later retired and new ATR-42 and Beechcraft 1900C turboprop commuter airliners were acquired which became the standard aircraft for all Continental Express regional air carriers at the time. The Dash 7s were retained for their STOL ability to serve the Aspen airport and were also used to operate service into the Telluride Airport with its airfield elevation of 9,070 feet. All Rocky Mountain aircraft received the new blue and gold livery introduced by Continental in 1990. Rocky Mountain was merged with fellow Continental Express subsidiary Britt Airways in 1991.

Destinations
Rocky Mountain Airways served the following destinations at various times during its existence:
Colorado
 Alamosa (ALS)
 Aspen (Aspen–Pitkin County Airport) (ASE)
 Colorado Springs (COS)
 Cortez (CEZ)
 Craig (CIG)
 Denver Stapleton International Airport (now closed) - Hub and headquarters
 Durango (DRO)
 Fort Collins (FNL)
 Granby (GNB)
 Grand Junction (GJT)
 Gunnison (GUC)
 Leadville (LXV)
 Montrose (MTJ)
 Pueblo (PUB)
 Steamboat Springs (Steamboat Springs Airport) (SBS)
 Telluride (TEX)
 Vail (Avon STOLport) (WHR) (now closed)
 Vail/Eagle (Eagle County Airport) (EGE)
Nebraska
 Grand Island (GRI)
 Lincoln (LNK)
 North Platte (LBF)
 Omaha (OMA)
 Scottsbluff (BFF)
New Mexico
 Farmington (FMN)
South Dakota
 Pierre (PIR)
 Rapid City (RAP)
Texas
 Amarillo (AMA)
 Lubbock (LBB)
Wyoming
 Casper (CPR)
 Cheyenne (CYS)
 Cody (COD)
 Gillette (GCC)
 Jackson Hole (JAC)
 Laramie (LAR)
 Riverton (RIW)
 Rock Springs (RKS)
 Sheridan (SHR)

Fleet
 Cessna 310 (operated by predecessor Vail Airways)
 de Havilland Canada DHC-6 Twin Otter
 de Havilland Canada DHC-7 Dash 7
 Rockwell Aero Commander (operated by predecessor Vail Airways)

Rocky Mountain Airways also operated ATR-42 and Beechcraft 1900C turboprops after becoming a Continental Express air carrier.

Accidents
On December 4, 1978, Rocky Mountain Airways Flight 217 crashed in snow-covered terrain at 10,530 feet MSL near Buffalo Pass, 9 miles(15 km) east of Steamboat Springs. All 22 persons aboard survived the impact, although a female passenger died four hours later (possibly from exposure before being rescued), and the injured pilot died in hospital, seventy hours later. The plane was forced down by extreme icing coupled with a strong mountain-wave-induced downdraft. The aircraft was a de Havilland Canada DHC-6-300 Twin Otter.

See also 
 List of defunct airlines of the United States

References

Defunct airlines of the United States
Companies based in Denver
Defunct companies based in Colorado
Airlines established in 1963
Airlines disestablished in 1986
1963 establishments in Colorado
1986 disestablishments in Colorado
American companies established in 1963